Lamkin is an unincorporated community and census-designated place (CDP) in Comanche County, Texas, United States. It was first listed as a CDP prior to the 2020 census.

It is in the southeast part of the county, along Texas State Highway 36, which leads northwest  to Comanche, the county seat, and southeast  to Hamilton. The Leon River, part of the Brazos River watershed, forms the eastern edge of the CDP.

References 

Populated places in Comanche County, Texas
Census-designated places in Comanche County, Texas
Census-designated places in Texas